Konstantin Rudenok (born 15 December 1990) is a Belarusian footballer who plays for Neman Grodno.

Honours
Dinamo Brest
Belarusian Cup winner: 2017–18

External links
 
 
 Profile at FC Gomel website

1990 births
Living people
Belarusian footballers
Association football goalkeepers
Belarusian expatriate footballers
Expatriate footballers in Russia
FC Gomel players
FC Naftan Novopolotsk players
FC Dynamo Brest players
FC Slutsk players
FC Isloch Minsk Raion players
FC Torpedo Minsk players
FC Armavir players
FC Dinamo Minsk players
FC Sputnik Rechitsa players
FC Shakhtyor Soligorsk players
FC Neman Grodno players